Aymen Belaïd (born 2 January 1989) is a French-born Tunisian footballer who plays as a centre back for FC Fleury 91 in the French Championnat National 2.

Belaïd is the younger brother of Tijani Belaid who had a stint at Italian club Internazionale. Though born in France, the younger Belaïd is a Tunisia youth international having starred for the Olympic team in qualification for the 2009 African Nations Championship.

Career
Born in Paris, Belaïd began his career with hometown club Paris FC and trained with the team until he was 15 years old. In 2005, he signed with professional club SM Caen and played on the club's under-16 team in the Championnat National 16 ans. After two seasons at the club, in August 2007, Belaïd departed the club for CS Louhans-Cuiseaux and spent a year playing on the club's under-18 team. In 2008, he departed France for the Czech Republic. Belaïd spent two months with the reserve team of Banik Most. In October 2008, he joined Sparta Prague, the rival of Slavia Prague, where his brother plays. While at Sparta, Belaïd alternated between the club's first team and the reserve team. During his stint, he also went on trials at Dutch club RKC Waalwijk and French club Grenoble. Belaïd's trial with the latter club was ultimately successful with the club signing him to a two-year contract in August 2010.

Rotherham United
On 8 January 2016, Belaïd signed a two and a half year contract with English Football League Championship side Rotherham United after a period training with the club whilst international clearance was received. On 31 August 2017 his Rotherham contract was terminated by mutual consent.

Ohod Club
On 27 February 2019, Belaïd signed for Saudi Arabian club Ohod from Levski Sofia on a free transfer, with a contract until the end of the 2018–19 season.

Fleury 91
Belaïd joined FC Fleury 91 on 31 January 2022, until the end of the 2021–22 season.

Career statistics

Honours
 Étoile Sportive du Sahel
 Tunisian Cup: 2011–12

References

External links
 
 
 Profile at LevskiSofia.info
 

Living people
1989 births
Footballers from Paris
Association football defenders
French footballers
Citizens of Tunisia through descent
Tunisian footballers
Tunisia international footballers
Tunisian expatriate footballers
Grenoble Foot 38 players
Étoile Sportive du Sahel players
PFC Lokomotiv Plovdiv players
PFC Levski Sofia players
Rotherham United F.C. players
Ohod Club players
FC Fleury 91 players
Ligue 2 players
Championnat National 2 players
English Football League players
First Professional Football League (Bulgaria) players
Saudi Professional League players
Expatriate footballers in the Czech Republic
Expatriate footballers in France
Expatriate footballers in Bulgaria
Expatriate footballers in Saudi Arabia
Expatriate footballers in England
Tunisian expatriate sportspeople in the Czech Republic
Tunisian expatriate sportspeople in France
Tunisian expatriate sportspeople in Bulgaria
Tunisian expatriate sportspeople in England
Tunisian expatriate sportspeople in Saudi Arabia
French sportspeople of Tunisian descent